Dave Petersen is an English rugby league footballer who plays as a  for the Doncaster R.L.F.C. in the RFL League 1.

Background
Petersen was born in Kingston upon Hull, East Riding of Yorkshire, England.

Doncaster R.L.F.C.
On 10 Dec 2021 it was reported that he had signed for Doncaster R.L.F.C. in the RFL League 1

References

1992 births
Living people
Batley Bulldogs players
Boston 13s players
Bradford Bulls players
Doncaster R.L.F.C. players
English rugby league players
Hull Kingston Rovers players
Mackay Cutters players
Oxford Rugby League players
Redcliffe Dolphins players
Rugby league locks
Rugby league players from Kingston upon Hull
Sheffield Eagles players
Workington Town players
York City Knights players